Cesar Chavez Jacobo (born 1985 June 1), is a Dominican professional basketball player. He attended high school at Our Savior New American School in Centereach, New York, USA.
Chavez Jacobo began his college career with the FIU Panthers from 2004 to 2006, but later transferred to St. Thomas University (Florida), which culminated with a conference championship in 2009. He began his professional career in 2009, in his native home of the Dominican Republic. Later he played profesionally in Latvia, Spain, Costa Rica, Chile and finally Colombia.

Personal life
He was born June 1, 1985, in Santo Domingo, Dominican Republic to his father Luis Chávez and mother Rosa Julie Jacobo de Chávez.

References

External links
Cesar Chavez-Jacobo at the Florida International University Athletics page
Ceser Jacobo Chavez at the St. Thomas University's 2008-2009 Men's Basketball Roster

1985 births
Living people
Dominican Republic men's basketball players
People from Centereach, New York
Point guards